The 2023 World Women's Curling Championship (branded as 2023 LGT World Women's Curling Championship for sponsorship reasons) is currently being held from March 18 to 26 at the Göransson Arena in Sandviken, Sweden.

The format for the Championship featured a thirteen team round robin. The top six teams qualified for the playoff round where the top two teams received a bye while the remaining four played the first round.

Qualification
Thirteen curling federations qualified to participate in the 2023 World Women's Curling Championship. This was the first year to qualify teams using the new 2022 Pan Continental Curling Championships, with New Zealand winning entry into the World Women's Championship for the first time, represented by a team skipped by Jessica Smith.

Teams
The teams were as follows:

WCF ranking
Year to date World Curling Federation order of merit ranking for each team prior to the event.

Round robin standings
After Draw 8

Round robin results

All draw times are listed in Central European Time (UTC+01:00).

Draw 1
Saturday, March 18, 2:00 pm

Draw 2
Saturday, March 18, 7:00 pm

Draw 3
Sunday, March 19, 9:00 am

Draw 4
Sunday, March 19, 2:00 pm

Draw 5
Sunday, March 19, 7:00 pm

Draw 6
Monday, March 20, 9:00 am

Draw 7
Monday, March 20, 2:00 pm

Draw 8
Monday, March 20, 7:00 pm

Draw 9
Tuesday, March 21, 9:00 am

Draw 10
Tuesday, March 21, 2:00 pm

Draw 11
Tuesday, March 21, 7:00 pm

Draw 12
Wednesday, March 22, 9:00 am

Draw 13
Wednesday, March 22, 2:00 pm

Draw 14
Wednesday, March 22, 7:00 pm

Draw 15
Thursday, March 23, 9:00 am

Draw 16
Thursday, March 23, 2:00 pm

Draw 17
Thursday, March 23, 7:00 pm

Draw 18
Friday, March 24, 9:00 am

Draw 19
Friday, March 24, 2:00 pm

Draw 20
Friday, March 24, 7:00 pm

Playoffs

Qualification Games
Saturday, March 25, 10:00 am

Semifinals
Saturday, March 25, 4:00 pm

Bronze medal game
Sunday, March 26, 10:00 am

Final
Sunday, March 26, 3:00 pm

Statistics

Top 5 player percentages
After Draw 8

Perfect games
Minimum 10 shots thrown

Final standings

Notes

References

World Women's Curling Championship
World Women's Championship
Sports competitions in Sandviken
Women's curling competitions in Sweden
International curling competitions hosted by Sweden
World Women's Curling Championship
World Championship
World Women's Curling Championship